Fuzhou, also Fuzhoucheng is a town under the administration of Wafangdian City, in southern Liaoning province, China. Dahe Reservoir is located several kilometres to the east. , it has 2 residential communities and 14 villages under its administration.

Notable people
Mou Weixin, politician, a member of the Provincial Assembly for Fuzhou in early 20th century.

See also 
 List of township-level divisions of Liaoning

References 

Towns in Liaoning
Wafangdian